New York City's 18th City Council district is one of 51 districts in the New York City Council. It is currently represented by Democrat Amanda Farías, who took office in 2022.

Geography
District 18 is based on the eastern shoreline of the East Bronx, covering Parkchester, Castle Hill, Soundview, and Clason Point. Soundview Park is located within the district.

The district overlaps with Bronx Community Boards 9 and 10, and with New York's 14th and 15th congressional districts. It also overlaps with the 32nd, 33rd, and 34th districts of the New York State Senate, and with the 82nd, 85th, and 87th districts of the New York State Assembly.

Recent election results

2021
In 2019, voters in New York City approved Ballot Question 1, which implemented ranked-choice voting in all local elections. Under the new system, voters have the option to rank up to five candidates for every local office. Voters whose first-choice candidates fare poorly will have their votes redistributed to other candidates in their ranking until one candidate surpasses the 50 percent threshold. If one candidate surpasses 50 percent in first-choice votes, then ranked-choice tabulations will not occur.

2017

2013

References

New York City Council districts